Juan Notz (born 21 October 1939) is a Venezuelan former tennis player.

Notz made his only Davis Cup appearance for Venezuela in his birth city of Caracas, against Ecuador in 1963. He lost the opening rubber of the tie to Eduardo Zuleta, before teaming up with Isaías Pimentel in the doubles to defeat Zuleta and Pancho Guzmán. In the reverse singles he won a dead rubber over Guzman in four sets.

A two-time doubles medalist at the Central American and Caribbean Games, Notz also represented Venezuela in two editions of the Pan American Games, in 1959 and 1963.

References

External links
 
 
 

1939 births
Living people
Venezuelan male tennis players
Tennis players from Caracas
Pan American Games competitors for Venezuela
Tennis players at the 1959 Pan American Games
Tennis players at the 1963 Pan American Games
Central American and Caribbean Games medalists in tennis
Central American and Caribbean Games silver medalists for Venezuela
Central American and Caribbean Games bronze medalists for Venezuela
Competitors at the 1959 Central American and Caribbean Games
Competitors at the 1962 Central American and Caribbean Games
20th-century Venezuelan people
21st-century Venezuelan people